The Americas Military Cup, is a football competition for national military teams in Americas, and was first held in 2001. It is organized by Organisation of Military Sport in Americas, a branch of the International Military Sports Council.
The tournament acts as qualification for the World Military Cup or the World Military Games.

Results

 A round-robin tournament determined the final standings.

Successful national teams

See also
 World Military Cup
 African Military Cup

External links
Americas Military Cup history - rsssf.com

Military association football competitions
Defunct international association football competitions in North America
International association football competitions in Central America
International association football competitions in the Caribbean
Defunct international association football competitions in South America
+
+
Recurring sporting events established in 2001
Recurring sporting events disestablished in 2009